Porlier Bay is the 3 km wide bay indenting for 1.6 km the north coast of Ioannes Paulus II Peninsula on Livingston Island in the South Shetland Islands, Antarctica. It is entered between Punta del Medio and Black Point, and includes Spiller Cove on the southeast. The area was visited by early 19th-century sealers.

The feature is named after Brigadier Rosendo Porlier y Asteguieta (1771–1819), commander of the Spanish naval squadron whose flagship San Telmo sank off the island with 644 men on board including Porlier in September 1819.  Remnants of the ship were found subsequently at the bay.

Location
British mapping in 1968, Spanish in 1991, and Bulgarian in 2005 and 2009.

Map
 L.L. Ivanov. Antarctica: Livingston Island and Greenwich, Robert, Snow and Smith Islands. Scale 1:120000 topographic map.  Troyan: Manfred Wörner Foundation, 2009.

References
 Bulgarian Antarctic Gazetteer. Antarctic Place-names Commission. (details in Bulgarian, basic data in English)
 Porlier Bay. SCAR Composite Antarctic Gazetteer

External links
 Porlier Bay. Copernix satellite image

Bays of Livingston Island
Bulgaria and the Antarctic